Parlour Tricks (previously Lily & the Parlour Tricks) are a pop band from New York City, originally composed of Lily Cato (lead vocalist and songwriter), Darah Golub and Morgane Hollowell (vocals), Angelo Spagnolo (guitar), Brian Kesley  (bass and synth), and Terry Moore (drums). The band met in 2009 while studying at The New School for Jazz and Contemporary Music. They cite diverse musical influences including Nine Inch Nails, The Andrews Sisters, and Francis and the Lights, and lyrical inspiration including the novel The Goldfinch by Donna Tartt.

The band were named Best Pop Band in New York for 2014 by the Village Voice, and have performed at Bonnaroo, SXSW, Summerfest, and the CMJ and CBGB Festivals.  they are touring North America with Electric Six.

Discography

Albums 
 2015: Broken Hearts/Bones (produced by Emery Dobyns)
 2019: Sweetheart

Singles 
 2015: Lovesongs / Requiem
 2015: The Storm

References

External links 
 Official home page
 Parlour Tricks SoundCloud channel
 Parlour Tricks on Twitter
 Parlour Tricks page at Bar/None Records

Indie pop groups from New York (state)
Musical groups established in 2006
Musical groups from New York City
Alternative rock groups from New York (state)
American synth-pop groups